The 1962 Los Angeles Angels  season involved the Angels finishing 3rd in the American League with a record of 86 wins and 76 losses, ten games behind the World Series Champion New York Yankees.  The 1962 Angels are one of only two teams to achieve a winning record in its second season of existence in the history of Major League Baseball (the other is the 1999 Arizona Diamondbacks of the National League, who finished as NL West Champions at 100–62). The 1962 Angels was the first Angels team to reside at Dodger Stadium, called Chavez Ravine by the team.

Offseason 
 October 19, 1961: Del Rice was released by the Angels.
 November 27, 1961: Bo Belinsky was drafted by the Angels from the Baltimore Orioles in the 1961 rule 5 draft.
 December 4, 1961: Ramón Hernández was purchased by the Angels from the Pittsburgh Pirates.

Regular season 
On May 5, Bo Belinsky threw the first no-hitter in the history of the Angels and the first one at Dodger Stadium, beating the Baltimore Orioles 2–0.

Season standings

Record vs. opponents

Notable transactions 
 September 8, 1962: Art Fowler was released by the Angels.

Roster

Player stats

Batting

Starters by position 
Note: Pos = Position; G = Games played; AB = At bats; H = Hits; Avg. = Batting average; HR = Home runs; RBI = Runs batted in

Other batters 
Note: G = Games played; AB = At bats; H = Hits; Avg. = Batting average; HR = Home runs; RBI = Runs batted in

Pitching

Starting pitchers 
Note: G = Games pitched; IP = Innings pitched; W = Wins; L = Losses; ERA = Earned run average; SO = Strikeouts

Other pitchers 
Note: G = Games pitched; IP = Innings pitched; W = Wins; L = Losses; ERA = Earned run average; SO = Strikeouts

Relief pitchers 
Note: G = Games pitched; W = Wins; L = Losses; SV = Saves; ERA = Earned run average; SO = Strikeouts

Awards and honors 
 Bill Rigney, Associated Press AL Manager of the Year

Farm system

Notes

References 
1962 Los Angeles Angels team page at Baseball Reference
1962 Los Angeles Angels team page at www.baseball-almanac.com

Los Angeles Angels seasons
Los Angeles Angels season